

Introduction 
In 2012, S.B. Patil Public School (SBPPS) was established. It is a CBSE-affiliated, NABET-accredited, British Council IDS-certified, English-medium, coeducational school located in Ravet, Pune, with classes ranging from Nursery to Grade XI. It is one of the world's leading and most prestigious educational institutions, whose mission is not only to guide students toward educational excellence but also to reach every tangent and explore every facet of each student, thereby providing a world-class academic education with a strong cultural foundation.

The S.B. Patil Public School has over 3,100 students; a professional and determined faculty of over 150 personnel for every level consisting of seasoned school heads, adept teachers, and relentless school personnel; the co-operation and support of stakeholders; the laurel of accreditation by the NABET in 2019 and the British Council ISA Certification in 2020; and has won numerous awards - both as an institute and by its faculty -for thei academic excellence.

References

Schools in Pune
Educational institutions established in 2012
2012 establishments in Maharashtra